Park Mi-sun (born March 10, 1967) is a South Korean comedian and TV host of variety shows, notably Quiz to Change the World, Happy Together - Season 3, and We Got Married.  In 1988, She made her official debut with a gold prize in the 2nd MBC TV Gag Contest. In October 1991, She moved to SBS when SBS was launched. She married Lee Bong-won (ko: 이봉원), who moved to SBS at the same time. She expanded her field of activity to KBS after she declared her freelance in September 1994. She also starred in the sitcoms Soonpoong Clinic, Tae-hee, Hye-kyo, Ji-hyun, and All My Love.

Personal life

Park Mi-sun graduated from Hanyang University in 1985 with a bachelor's degree in Theater and Film.

She is married to fellow comedian Lee Bong-won. They have two children, son Lee Sang-yeob and daughter Lee Yu-ri.

Filmography

Television shows 
Attack on Sisters (2022) ; with Jang Young-ran 
Golf Battle: Birdie Buddies (2022–2023); Narrator (Season 4–5) 
Avatar Singer (2022) 
Taste of Travel (2022) 
 High School Daddy (2022–2023); Season 1–3
 Fan Heart Contest (2022) 
 Mask Debate (2022)
 Teacher of Narat (2021–2022)
 Chosun Panstar (2021) 
 MBC is Back (2021)
 Exercise Restaurant (2021–present)
 Steve JOBson ([2021)
 Misun: Impossible (2020-present)
Don't be the First One! (2020-present)
 Modern K-Pop History, Bangjajeon (2014)
 Whale Wars (2014)
 Hey Fox (2014)
 Mamma Mia (2013-2014)
 Daechan Life (2013-2014)
 Shinmungo (2013)
 Bonanza Show Bang Bang Bang (2013)
 Blind Test Show 180° (2013)
 How's Your Husband? (2012)
 Star King (2012)
 The Great Birth - Season 2 (2012)
 Encore, Rebellion of the Tone-deaf (2011-2012)
 Even If It's Hateful, Once Again (2011-2012)
 We Got Married (2011–2017)
 Comedy Star (2010)
 Kind Mi-sun (2010)
 Intimate Note - Season 3 (2009-2010)
 Happy Together - Season 3 (2008-2015)
 Quiz to Change the World (2008-2012)
 Cheerful Hero (2008)
 True or False (2008)
 Sponge 2.0 (2007-2008)
 Bad Housewife (2007)
 Love in Asia (2007-2008)
 Let's Try to Live Well (2006-2007)
 Talk Talk Talk at 2 p.m. (2006-2007)
 Capture the Moment, How Is That Possible (2006-2008)
 Economic Vitamin (2006-2007)
 대발견 IQ (2005)
 Couple's Diary (2005)
 What An Amazing World (2002-2009)
 Gag Concert (2002)
 발견천하 Eureka (2002)
 Man in Crisis (2002)
 Happy TV (2000)
 Studio of Love (1999)
 Current Affairs Comedy File (1999)
 Video ActionQ (1998)
 Show! Missy Republic (1995)
 TV Talk (1995)
 The Incredible People (1995)
 Comedy Observatory (1991)
 A Good Laugh at Saturday 7 p.m. (1991)
 Youth March (1988)

Television series
 To. Jenny (2018)
 Sweet Revenge (2017)
 What Is Mom? (2012)
 The Greatest Love (2011) - cameo
 All My Love (2010)
 Tae-hee, Hye-kyo, Ji-hyun (2009)
 Golden Bride (2007)
 Please Come Back, Soon-ae (2006)
 Oolla Boolla Blue-jjang (2004)
 Soonpoong Clinic (1998-2000)

Films
 Tone-deaf Clinic  (2012)
 Fortune Salon (2009)
 Boy Goes to Heaven (2005) - cameo
 There We Were  (2004)
 Two Wacky Heroes  (1990)
 The Winter of the Kiwi (1987) - extra
 Potato (1987)

Radio programs
 Lee Bong-won and Park Mi-sun's Wa Wa Show (2010)
 Lee Bong-won and Park Mi-sun's Our House Radio (2008-2009)
 Kim Heung-gook and Park Mi-sun's Korean Special Show (2003)
 Jeon Yu-seong and Park Mi-sun's Radio Special Operation (1997)
 Kim Heung-gook and Park Mi-sun's Radio Special Operation (1997)

Awards
 2013 KBS Entertainment Awards: Top Excellence Award, Female Entertainer in a Variety Show (Mamma Mia, Happy Together - Season 3)
 2011 23rd Korean PD Awards: Best Performer, TV Host category
 2011 MBC Entertainment Awards: Top Excellence Award, Female Entertainer in a Variety Show (Quiz to Change the World)
 2010 MBC Entertainment Awards: Top Excellence Award, MC category (Quiz to Change the World)
 2009 MBC Entertainment Awards: Top Excellence Award, Actress in a Sitcom or Comedy (Tae-hee, Hye-kyo, Ji-hyun)
 2009 KBS Entertainment Awards: Top Excellence Award, Female Entertainer in a Variety Show (Comedy Star, Happy Together - Season 3)
 2009 45th Baeksang Arts Awards: Best Female Variety Performer (Sunday Night)
 2008 MBC Entertainment Awards: Top Excellence Award, Female Entertainer in a Variety Show
 2007 9th KBS Right Language Awards: Recipient
 2005 12th Korean Entertainment Arts Awards: Best Radio Host
 2004 SBS Drama Awards: Special Award for Radio (Korean Special Show)
 2000 36th Baeksang Arts Awards: Best Female Comedian (Soonpoong Clinic)
 1999 MBC Drama Awards: Top Excellence Award in Radio
 1996 MBC Drama Awards: Excellence Award in Radio 
 1988 MBC Drama Awards: Best Newcomer in Comedy
 1988 2nd MBC Gag Contest: Gold Medal

References

External links
  at CUBE Etertainment 

Park Mi-sun at New-Able Entertainment

South Korean women comedians
South Korean television presenters
South Korean women television presenters
South Korean film actresses
South Korean television actresses
Cube Entertainment artists
IHQ (company) artists
Hanyang University alumni
Living people
1967 births
Gag Concert
Best Variety Performer Female Paeksang Arts Award (television) winners